Abigail Forbes (born March 10, 2001) is an American junior tennis player.

Career
Forbes won the 2019 Wimbledon Girls' Doubles title with Savannah Broadus, joining three other Americans in the finals of the juniors tournaments. On 10 August, 2019 she and Alexa Noel won the USTA Girls 18s National Championships in Doubles, earning them a wild-card entry into the main draw of the 2019 US Open.

Forbes has a career high ITF junior combined ranking of 16th achieved on 14 October 2019. She began attending UCLA for the Fall 2019 semester.

Junior Grand Slam titles

Doubles: 1 (1 title)

References

External links
 
 
Profile on UCLA Bruins

2001 births
Living people
American female tennis players
African-American female tennis players
Sportspeople from Raleigh, North Carolina
Wimbledon junior champions
UCLA Bruins women's tennis players
Grand Slam (tennis) champions in girls' doubles
Tennis people from North Carolina